Robert Adam (1728–1792) was a British designer.

Robert Adam may also refer to:
Robert Adam (architect, born 1948), a British classical architect
Robert Borthwick Adam (1833–1904), American retailer and book collector
Robert Adam (?–1952), British captain of the cargo ship Rosita killed by a ROC-ACNSA gunboat attack under the Kuomingtang's Guanbi policy.
Rob Adam (born 1955), South African scientist
Robert Adam (fl. 1977–2017), architect with ADAM Architecture
Róbert Ádám (born 1982), Hungarian weightlifter, competitor in the 2007 World Weightlifting Championships – Men's 56 kg

See also
Robert Adams (disambiguation)